The Murzuq Desert, Idehan Murzuq, Idhan Murzuq, (also Murzaq, Murzuk, Marzuq and Murzak), is an erg in southwestern Libya with a surface of approximately 58,000 km2. It is named after the town of Murzuk in the Fezzan. Like the Idehan Ubari further north, the Idehan Murzuq is part of the greater Sahara Desert region. It is separated from the southern Sahara Desert by the Tibesti Mountains and the Tassili n'Ajjer.

Dune pattern
The “Draa” dunes (from the Arabic for “arm”) are very large masses of sand in the western part of Libya's vast  Murzuq Desert, and they appear in satellite images as a broad network of yellow-orange sand masses, with smooth-floored, almost sand-free basins between them. Geologists think that the draa of the Marzuq were probably formed by winds different from the prevailing north-northeast winds of today.

Numerous smaller dunes have developed on the backs of the draa. Three distinct dune types are visible in satellite images of the region: 
Longitudinal dunes, more or less parallel with the north winds.
Transverse dunes, usually more curved and formed at right angles to the wind.
Star dunes, in which several linear arms converge towards a single peak.

The upwind sides of the sand masses appear smoother than the downwind side. Wind is moving sand grains almost all the time. This means that the draa and the dunes are all moving as sand is added on the upwind side and blown off the downwind side. Small sand masses move much faster than large sand masses. 

The draa are almost stationary, but the smaller dunes move relatively quickly across their backs. When the smaller dunes reach the downwind side of the draa, they are obliterated; their sand is blown across the basins as individual grains.

Petroleum
Since oil exploration began in 1957, eleven oil fields have been discovered in the Murzuq Basin. Two of the fields are considered giants, and altogether there are more than 2 billion barrels of oil in reserves under the desert there.

See also
Geography of Libya
List of ergs

References

External links

View of the entire Murzuq Desert seen from the International Space Station

Deserts of Libya
Fezzan
Ergs of Africa
Sahara